Nationality words link to articles with information on the nation's poetry or literature (for instance, Irish or France).

Events
 Henri III of France revived the Académie du Palais, and Philippe Desportes becomes one of its most active members.

Works published

France
 Rémy Belleau:
 Les Amours et nouveaux échanges despierres précieuses, also known as Pierres précieuses poems on the image and arcane powers of precious stone
 Eclogues sacrées
 Philippe Desportes, an edition of his works

Great Britain
 The Paradise of Dainty Devices, the most popular of the Elizabethan verse miscellanies, anthology
 Thomas Achelley, A Most Lamentable and Tragicall Historie
 George Gascoigne, The Steele Glas: a Satyre; Togither with the Complainte of Phylomene, called the first non-dramatic poem in blank verse in the English language; an "estates" satire
 George Whetstone, The Rocke of Regard, mostly verse

Other
 Baptista Mantuanus, Opera Omnia ("Complete Works"), Italian poet writing in Latin, Antwerp
 Tulsidas, Ramcharitmanas, Indian poet writing in the Awadhi dialect of Hindi
 Jan van der Noot - Das Buch Extasis, Dutch poet writing in German, Cologne

Births
 October 7 (baptism) – John Marston (died 1634), English playwright, poet, and satirist
Also
 Charles Fitzgeoffrey (died 1638), English Elizabethan poet and clergyman
 Jean Ogier de Gombauld (died 1666), French playwright and poet
 John Weever (died 1632), English poet and antiquary

Deaths
 January 19 – Hans Sachs (born 1494), German Meistersinger
 Girolamo Muzio (born 1496), Italian, Latin-language poet
 Mavro Vetranović (born 1482), Croatian writer, poet and Benedictine friar
 Lu Zhi (born 1496), Chinese landscape painter, calligrapher and poet

See also

 Poetry
 16th century in poetry
 16th century in literature
 Dutch Renaissance and Golden Age literature
 Elizabethan literature
 French Renaissance literature
 Renaissance literature
 Spanish Renaissance literature

Notes

16th-century poetry
Poetry